Vasalemmoceras is a genus of nautiloid cephalopods from the upper Caradocian of Estonia, assigned to the Tarphycerida. The type species is Vasalemmoceras tolerabile Stumbur, 1962.

References

 Jack Sepkoski, 2000. List of cephalopod genera      
  Charactoceras tolerabile (Stumbur, 1962)

Prehistoric nautiloid genera